Feyaerts is a Belgian surname. Notable people with the surname include:

Fernand Feyaerts (1880–1927), Belgian swimmer and water polo player
Wim Feyaerts, Belgian television director

Surnames of Belgian origin